The Crusader is an American drama series that aired on CBS from October 7, 1955 to December 28, 1956.

Plot
Freelance writer Matt Anders worked to help people living in communists regimes escape to free nations.

Cast
Brian Keith as Matt Anders

References

1955 American television series debuts
1956 American television series endings
CBS original programming
1950s American drama television series